
Year 311 (CCCXI) was a common year starting on Monday (link will display the full calendar) of the Julian calendar. At the time, it was known as the Year of the Consulship of Valerius and Maximinus (or, less frequently, year 1064 Ab urbe condita). The denomination 311 for this year has been used since the early medieval period, when the Anno Domini calendar era became the prevalent method in Europe for naming years.

Events 
 By place 

 Roman Empire 
 April 30 – Emperor Galerius declares on his deathbed religious freedom, and issues his Edict of Toleration, ending persecution of Christians in the Eastern part of the Roman Empire. 
 May 5 – Galerius dies, age 51, from a gruesome disease, possibly bowel cancer or Fournier gangrene.
 Maximinus Daza and Licinius divide the Eastern Empire between themselves. 
 Maximinus recommences the persecution of Christians, having encouraged his subjects to petition him to do so.
 Fearing an alliance between Licinius and Constantine I, Maximinus forges a secret alliance with Emperor Maxentius.

 China 
 July 13 – Huai of Jin, emperor of the Jin Dynasty, is captured at Luoyang. The capital city is pillaged by Liu Cong, ruler of the Xiongnu state; the invaders slaughter 30,000 citizens.

 By topic 

 Religion 
 July 2 – Pope Miltiades succeeds Eusebius as the 32nd pope of Rome.
 The Donatist schism occurs in the African Church.

Births

Deaths 
 November 25 – Peter I, patriarch of Alexandria 
 December 3 – Diocletian, Roman emperor (b. 244)
 Domitius Alexander, Roman emperor and usuper
 Gaius Galerius Valerius Maximianus, Roman emperor
 Gou Xi (or Daojiang), Chinese inspector and general
 Sima Yue (or Yuanchao), Chinese prince and regent 
 Wang Mi (or Zigu), Chinese general and rebel leader
 Wang Yan, Chinese official and politician (b. 256)

References